is a Japanese monthly manga magazine published by Shogakukan, starting in May 1976. Its main target is elementary school aged boys, younger than the readers of shōnen manga. It features super heroes such as Kamen Rider, Super Sentai, Ultraman and Metal Hero, all of whom have gone on to be cultural phenomena in Japan.

The name is a portmanteau of terebi, the Japanese word for television, and kun, a Japanese honorific for small children, mainly young boys.

References

Kodomo manga magazines
Magazines established in 1976
Magazines published in Tokyo
Monthly manga magazines published in Japan
Shogakukan magazines